Miller Anderson (born 12 April 1945) is a UK-based blues and rock guitarist and singer.

He worked extensively with Ian Hunter in the formative years of the 1960s, before either of them achieved significant success. They worked in bands such as the Scenery and At Last The 1958 Rock 'n' Roll Show (later called Charlie Woolfe) and Anderson is referenced in the title track of Hunter's 1976 album All American Alien Boy ("well I remember all the good times me and Miller enjoyed, up and down the M1 in some luminous yo-yo toy"). Anderson would later guest on two Hunter solo albums.

Apart from pursuing his solo career, he was a member of the Keef Hartley Band. Other groups he has been associated with are the Spencer Davis Group, Broken Glass, the Dukes, Mountain, Savoy Brown, T.Rex and Chicken Shack. In early 2006, he joined the British Blues Quintet with Maggie Bell, Zoot Money, Colin Hodgkinson and Colin Allen.

In the spring of 2016, Anderson returned to the studio and in July 2016 released a new album, Through the Mill.

Anderson was born in Houston, Renfrewshire, Scotland.

Discography

Solo
Bright City (1971)
Celtic Moon (1998)
Bluesheart (2003, re-issue 2007)
Chameleon (2008)
From Lizard Rock (DCD 2009)
Live at Rockpalast (MIG Music – MIG 90 352) CD 2010
Through the Mill (2016  - Anderson / Sherman Productions)
Live in Vienna (2017  - Brücken Ton)

With Keef Hartley Band
Halfbreed (1969)
The Battle of North West Six (1969)
The Time Is Near (1970)
Overdog (1971)
Little Big Band – Live at the Marquee (1971)

With Hemlock
Hemlock (1972)

With Savoy Brown 
Boogie Brothers (1974)

With Dog Soldier 
Dog Soldier (1975)

With the Dukes 
The Dukes (album, 1979)

With Spencer Davis Group
Live in Manchester 2002 (2003/2004, DVD/CD)

With the British Blues Quintet
Live in Glasgow 2006 (2007)

With Jon Lord Blues Project
Jon Lord Blues Project Live (2011)

Guest appearances
Two Weeks Last Summer (1972, Dave Cousins)
Overnight Angels (1977, Ian Hunter)
Short Back and Sides (1981, Ian Hunter)
Before I Forget (1982, Jon Lord) 
Superblues (1994, Pete York)
Swinging Hollywood (1994, Pete York)
Pictured Within (1998, Jon Lord)
Live at the Royal Albert Hall (2000, Deep Purple)
Not for the Pro's (2002, Ian Paice)
Beyond the Notes (2004, Jon Lord)
Beyond the Notes Live (2004, Jon Lord, DVD)
The Boy in the Sailor Suit (2007, Dave Cousins)
Hotel Eingang (2008, Chris Farlowe)

References

External links

Interview with Miller Anderson (by Dmitry M. Epstein, March 2008)

1945 births
Living people
Scottish rock guitarists
Scottish male guitarists
People from Renfrewshire
British blues guitarists
British rhythm and blues boom musicians
Glam rock musicians
Savoy Brown members
Chicken Shack members
T. Rex (band) members
The Spencer Davis Group members
The Dukes (British band) members